The 1980–81 Serie A season was the 47th season of the Serie A, the top level of ice hockey in Italy. Eight teams participated in the league, and HC Gherdeina won the championship.

Regular season

External links
 Season on hockeytime.net

Serie
Serie A (ice hockey) seasons
Italy